R Volantis is a single variable star in the southern circumpolar constellation Volans. It has an average apparent magnitude of 8.7, making it readily visible in amateur telescopes but not to the naked eye.

R Volantis'  peculiarity was first observed in 1954 when it was found to have emission lines in its spectrum. Observations from 1955 to 1967 reveal that the star was a probable Mira variable and was given its current designation. However, its nature as a carbon star wasn't discovered until 1968 by Pik-Sin The. In the paper,  R Volantis and V1163 Centauri (HD 114586) had their spectrums studied and revealed that the former is a carbon star while the latter is an S-type star. 

R Volantis has a stellar classification of Ce, indicating that it is a carbon star with emission lines. It is a giant star on the asymptotic giant branch, meaning that it is generating energy via hydrogen and helium shells around an inert carbon core.

It fluctuates between magnitude 8.7 and 15.4 and has a period of 445 days.

References

Volans (constellation)
Carbon stars
Mira variables
Variable stars
CD-72 378
Asymptotic-giant-branch stars
Emission-line stars
Volantis, R